Laurilia sulcata is a species of fungus belonging to the family Echinodontiaceae.

It is native to Eurasia and Northern America.

References

Russulales